Houlletia brocklehurstiana is a species of orchid native to Brazil (from Rio de Janeiro to Paraná). It is the type species of the genus Houlletia.

References

External links 

brocklehurstiana
Endemic orchids of Brazil
Orchids of Rio de Janeiro (state)
Orchids of Paraná (state)